Zhao Jiuzhang (15 October 1907 – 26 October 1968), also known as Jeou Jang Jaw, was a Chinese meteorologist and physicist. He was a pioneer of Chinese space technology and is considered as a founding father of China's satellite program.

Life
Born in Kaifeng, Henan Province on 15 October 1907. From 1925 to 1927, he studied electrical engineering at Zhejiang Industrial School (now Zhejiang University) in Hangzhou. He then transferred to Tsinghua University in Beijing. He graduated from the Department of Physics, Tsinghua in 1933. In 1935, he went to the University of Berlin; in 1938, he obtained his PhD.

He was a professor of Tsinghua University, National Central University (now Nanjing University), and National Southwestern Associated University.

During the Cultural Revolution, he was persecuted by the Red Guards and committed suicide in October 1968.

Membership & presidency
Academic
 Academician, Chinese Academy of Science, 1955 election
 Director, Institute of Meteorology, Academia Sinica
 Director, Institute of Geophysics, Chinese Academy of Sciences
 Director, Institute of Applied Geophysics, Chinese Academy of Science
 President, Chinese Academy of Satellite Designation
 President, Chinese Meteorological Society
 President, Chinese Geophysical Society

Political
 Member, Jiusan Society, 1951 election
 Member, Central Committee of the Jiu San Society.
 Member, Standing Committee of the National People's Congress, PRC
 Standing Committee Member, Chinese People's Political Consultative Conference,

See also
 Dong Fang Hong I - the first satellite that China launched in 1970.

References

External links

1907 births
1968 suicides
Chinese meteorologists
Drug-related suicides in China
Educators from Henan
Members of the Chinese Academy of Sciences
Members of the Jiusan Society
Academic staff of the National Southwestern Associated University
People from Kaifeng
People of the Republic of China
Physicists from Henan
Suicides during the Cultural Revolution
Tsinghua University alumni
Academic staff of the University of Science and Technology of China
Zhejiang University alumni
Humboldt University of Berlin alumni